Mount Korbu is a mountain in Hulu Kinta, Perak, Malaysia, about 25 km from Ipoh. It is the highest peak in the state of Perak , located on the Titiwangsa Mountains, the southernmost section of the Tenasserim Hills.

Mount Korbu is also the second highest mountain in Peninsular Malaysia, standing at 2,183 metres (4 metres lower than the highest peak, Mount Tahan that stands at 2,187 metres in the state of Pahang). A reasonable level of physical fitness is required to climb/trek Mount Korbu. It used to take an average climber four days and three nights for a return trip, but the duration has been cut short in recent years and some have even made it within 12 hours. Most climbers now make do without any guide as the trail has become very obvious (at some stretches the trails are badly deteriorated due to over-trekking), but, as for other local mountains, there are occasional reports of climbers getting lost. Mount Gayong (2,173 m), the fourth highest mountain in Peninsular Malaysia, can be reached in about a 90-minute (one way) trek from the peak of Mount Korbu.

Between 23 and 26 May 2013, 65 volunteers took part in a trail maintenance and clean-up project on Mount Korbu via the Sungai Termin Trail. It was the second such conservation project of the non-profit Adopt A Mountain (AdAM).

North of the Sungai Termin Trail is the Sungai Seno'oi (or Senoi) Trail which is much less trekked. It climbs to the summit through a different ridge and, as of 2018, does not suffer from over-trekking. The lower stretch however, is densely covered in several locations.

Nearby
8 km away south of Mount Korbu, straddling the Perak-Kelantan border is Mount Yong Belar, Peninsular Malaysia's third tallest mountain, standing at 2,181 metres (7,156 ft) above sea level.

See also
 List of mountains of Malaysia

References

Korbu
Titiwangsa Mountains